Stanisław Szymański may refer to:
 Stanisław Szymański (industrialist) (1862 – 1944)
 Stanisław Szymański (dancer) (1930 - 1999)